Manoj Mitra (born 22 December 1938) is an Indian theatre, film and television actor, director and playwright.

Early life
Mitra was born on 22 December 1938 in Dhulihar village of Satkhira, Khulna, Bangladesh. Initially he used to study at home because his father Ashok Kumar Mitra, who had a transferable job. Mitra was attracted to the Jatras and plays that used to be held in their courtyard during the Durga Pujas but was forbidden by senior family members to participate in any way. His school life began after the Partition at a school (Dandirhat N.K.U.S. Niketan) near Basirhaat. Later he joined the Scottish Church College with honours in philosophy and graduated in 1958. He used to write short stories and many of them appeared in various magazines. It was at Scottish Church that he got initiated to theatre. There were regular shows at the college where the likes of Badal Sarkar, Rudraprasad Sengupta and others were students. He did his MA in philosophy from the University of Calcutta and began research for a doctorate. But by then he and friends like theatre and film director Partha Pratim Chowdhury had begun the group Sundaram. He began by teaching philosophy in the Suri Vidyasagar College (only one day) and later joined the drama department at the Rabindra Bharati University, where he became the head of department and retired as Sisirkumar Bhaduri professor of RBU. But by then he was a leading playwright of Bengal. He was writing, directing and acting in plays. His first play Mrityur Chokhe Jal won him first prize at the statewide competition. He has written over a hundred plays like Mrityur Chokhe Jal, Sajano Bagaan, Chokhe Angul Dada, Kaalbihongo, Parabas, Alokanandar Putra Kanya, Narak Guljar, Aswathama, Chakbhanga Madhu, Mesh O Rakhash, Noisho Bhoj, Chhayar Prashad, Galpo Hekim Saheb, Rajdarshan, Debi Swarpamasta, Munni O Saat Chowkidar, Ranger haat, Ja Nei Bharatey. While most of these plays were produced by Sundaram, major theatre groups have produced his works like Theatre Workshop, Bohurupee etc. He also played a soulful role in the movie "Hothat Bristy" (Sudden Rain) in 1998 was produced by both Bangladesh & India  Hothat Brishti. His works have been translated into many languages and produced by directors like Ratan Thiyam, Rajendar Nath and others. His latest play Aschourjo Funtosee is now being produced by Sundaram in Kolkata, India. He has written several books on film and theatre.

He was the President of the Paschim Banga Natya Akademi from which he resigned citing health issues on August, 2019.

Awards and honours 
 Sangeet Natak Akademy Award for Best Playwright (1985)
 Calcutta University Award for Best Playwright (1986)
 West Bengal State Government Award for Best Playwright (1983 & 1989)
 Asiatic Society's Gold Medal (2005)
 Filmfare Award East for Best Actor (1980)
 Munir Chowdhury Award from Bangladesh Theatre Society (2011)
 Dinabandhu Puraskar (25 May 2012)
 Kalakar Awards

Career in cinema
Mitra has acted in films by a diverse variety of directors such as Tapan Sinha, Satyajit Ray, Buddhadeb Dasgupta, Basu Chatterjee, Tarun Majumdar, Shakti Samanta and Goutam Ghose.

He is best known for the lead role in Tapan Sinha's film Banchharamer Bagan, which is based on Mitra's play Sajano Bagaan (The Arranged Garden). and his roles in Satyajit Ray's Ghare Baire and Ganashatru. He played a comedy and antagonist roles in hundreds of Bengali movies.

References

External links
 

Living people
Culture of Kolkata
Screenwriters from Kolkata
Scottish Church College alumni
University of Calcutta alumni
Academic staff of Rabindra Bharati University
Indian theatre directors
Indian male dramatists and playwrights
Male actors in Bengali cinema
Recipients of the Sangeet Natak Akademi Award
Bengali Hindus
Kalakar Awards winners
Bengali theatre personalities
1938 births
20th-century Indian dramatists and playwrights
Dramatists and playwrights from West Bengal